Avak-e Pain (also Romanized as Āvak-e Pā’īn; also known as Avak) is a village in Kuhak Rural District, in the Central District of Jahrom County, Fars Province, Iran. At the 2006 census, its population was 72, in 10 families.

References 

Populated places in Jahrom County